Joseph "Joe" Gilmore (19 May 1922 – 18 December 2015) was a renowned bartender and famous mixologist during the 20th century. He was Head Barman at The Savoy Hotel's American Bar from 1954 to 1976 and is recognised as the creator of numerous cocktails to mark special events and important guests, a longstanding tradition at the American Bar. Gilmore's most famous creations include Moonwalk, Link-Up, The Corpse Reviver, Lorraine, and Missouri Mule.

Early life 
Joseph Patrick Gilmore was born on 19 May 1922 in Belfast, Northern Ireland to John Gilmore, a tobacconist, and Margaret O'Connor, a teaching assistant, originally from Wicklow, Ireland.

He was the third of nine children.

In 1938, at age 16, Gilmore moved to London looking for work and adventure. He began working as a wallpaper packer at the Arthur Sanderson & Son's factory in Perivale, London, later moving to a Lyons Corner House as a kitchen hand with the prospect of receiving decent cooked meals.

Gilmore began his early bartender training at La Coquille, a french restaurant on St Martin's Lane, Covent Garden and The Olde Bell at Hurley. While working at The Olde Bell he met and served Welsh millionaire steel-baron Kenneth Davies and the aviator Amy Johnston. The couple reportedly asked Gilmore for a dry martini, which he attempted unsuccessfully. Despite his attempt being enjoyed by the couple, Davies and Johnston politely demonstrated the correct way to make a dry martini. Gilmore cited this interaction as the spark that fuelled his passion of cocktail mixology. After this first encounter Davies and Gilmore remained life long friends.

Career 
Gilmore first began working at The Savoy as a commis waiter at The American Bar. By 1940, at age 18, he was promoted to trainee barman and began his apprenticeship with the legendary Harry Craddock, earning £3.10s a week.

Craddock had spent many years living and working in The United States of America. While working in a variety of fashionable establishments such as Cleveland's Hollenden Hotel, New York's Knickerbocker Hotel and Hoffman House, Craddock learnt the new art of cocktail making, known then as 'American' drinks in Europe. Craddock left the United States during the Prohibition in 1920, and brought his skills, passion and knowledge to London and The Savoy Hotel. Craddock is most famous for being the author of the mixologists' bible, The Savoy Cocktail Book.

In 1954, Gilmore took over as head bartender at The Savoy's, American Bar - which at the time was a national news story. Over the following two decades Gilmore continued the long standing tradition of creating new cocktails, especially to honour special occasions and important guests including Princess Diana, Prince William, Anne, The Princess Royal, The Queen Mother, Sir Winston Churchill, and American Presidents Harry S. Truman and Richard Nixon.

For much of the 20th century, The Savoy's American Bar was an exclusive meeting place for the rich and powerful of Britain and the world. In addition to serving five generations of royals at private receptions and parties, Gilmore frequently served Winston Churchill, Errol Flynn, Laurel and Hardy, Charlie Chaplin, Dwight D. Eisenhower, Grace Kelly, George Bernard Shaw, Ernest Hemingway, Noël Coward, Agatha Christie, Alice Faye, Ingrid Bergman, Julie Andrews, Laurence Olivier, Joan Crawford, Judy Garland, Liza Minnelli, Bing Crosby and Frank Sinatra.

During World War II Winston Churchill frequented the American Bar regularly. He had his own entrance and kept his own large bottle of Black & White whisky behind the bar. When Gilmore created a cocktail in his honour, Churchill gave him one of his famous cigars.

Gilmore became more than a barman during his tenure, he was also a goodwill ambassador for The Savoy, which lead him on numerous trips throughout Europe, the United States and Canada, and regularly appeared on radio and TV chat shows.

In 1969, he created one of his most famous cocktails, the ‘Moonwalk’ to commemorate the Apollo 11 moon landing. The cocktail is a combination of grapefruit juice, orange liqueur and rose water, topped with champagne. This was the first drink astronauts Neil Armstrong and Buzz Aldrin had upon returning to earth.

In 1975 he created the 'Link-Up' to celebrate the Apollo–Soyuz Test Project, the first crewed international space mission carried out jointly by the United States and the Soviet Union. The cocktail is a shaken combination of Southern Comfort, Russian vodka, and a teaspoon of lime juice. When the astronauts were told the cocktail was being flown out from London to be enjoyed upon their return, they said, "Tell Joe we want it up here".

When the breathalyser was introduced in Britain, Gilmore was interviewed on NBC in New York. He was asked if the new technology had affected business, in which he responded “Not here, all our customers are chauffeur-driven”.

Frank Sinatra was a frequent guest to the American Bar whenever he was in London and insisted only Gilmore was to serve him. It is widely believed the line from Sinatra’s classic ‘One For My Baby’ “set’em up Joe” is in reference to Gilmore.

Gilmore retired from the Savoy in 1976.

Personal life 
Joe Gilmore married Marie Jeanne Zambelli in 1943. They had three sons, Joseph, Brian and Anthony.

During The Blitz, Gilmore took on the role as a fire warden on the roof of The Savoy.

Despite never returning to live in Ireland, Gilmore was proud of his Irish roots and culture, and never lost his Belfast accent. Gilmore grew up and remained a devout Roman Catholic throughout his whole life.

He past away in December 2015 at age 93.

Cocktails created by Joe Gilmore

The Blenheim

Created for Sir Winston Churchill’s ninetieth birthday.  It is also known as the Four Score and Ten.

Churchill

Created for Sir Winston Churchill on one of his many visits to The Savoy.

Common market

Created to mark Britain’s entry into the European Economic Community in 1973, using drinks from all the member states.

Four score (1955)

Created for Sir Winston Churchill’s eightieth birthday.

Golden doublet

Created in 1973 to commemorate the wedding of Princess Anne to Captain Mark Phillips. Doublet was the name of the Princess’s horse on which she participated in the European Championships in 1973.

Kensington Court special

Created for Sir David Davies.

Link up

Created in 1975 to mark the American and Russians link up in Space, the Apollo–Soyuz project. The link up cocktail was sent to the U.S. and U.S.S.R. for the astronauts to enjoy when they returned from their mission.  When told this by NASA as they linked up in Space, they responded, "Tell Joe we want it up here."

Lorraine

Created to mark President Charles de Gaulle’s State visit to Britain after the Second World War.

Missouri mule

The Missouri mule cocktail was created for President Harry S Truman.  The cocktail commemorates Truman's home state of Missouri and the donkey mascot of the Democratic Party (a mule is a hybrid of a donkey and a horse).

Moonwalk

Created in 1969 to mark the first moon landing. The cocktail was the first drink the American astronauts had when they returned to Earth. A letter of thanks was later sent from Neil Armstrong to Joe Gilmore.

My Fair Lady

Created to mark Julie Andrews’ first night in the musical My Fair Lady.

Nixon

Created in 1969 to mark American President Richard Nixon's visit to Britain. The cocktail was mixed at the American bar and then sent over to Claridge's where Nixon was staying.

Powerscourt

Created for Sarah, Duchess of York’s

The Ed Shelly

Created for Edward Shelly at his request.

Royal arrival

Created in 1960 to mark the birth of Prince Andrew.

Savoy affair

Created by Joe Gilmore at the Atlantic Hotel, Hamburg, Germany.

Savoy royale

Created for The Queen Mother on one of her private visits to The Savoy.

Savoy corpse reviver

The Corpse Revivers are a series of hangover cures invented during prohibition. This recipe is a variation invented by Gilmore in 1954.

Wolfram

Created in 1990 to commemorate the election of John Wolff Director of Rudolf Wolff as Chairman of the London Metal Exchange.  "Wolfram" is another name for the element tungsten.

See also

 List of cocktails

References

Further reading
 
 
 
 Nicholas Foulkes "Joe Gilmore and his cocktails" (2003)

1922 births
2015 deaths
Bartenders
People from Belfast